Tom Christopher Elliott (born 21 November 1991) is an English former first-class cricketer.

Elliott was born at Epsom in November 1991. He was educated at Tonbridge School, before going up to Sidney Sussex College, Cambridge. While studying at Cambridge, he played first-class cricket for both Cambridge University and Cambridge MCCU from 2012 to 2014. He made five appearances for Cambridge MCCU and three appearances for Cambridge University in The University Match against Oxford. He scored 306 runs in his eight appearances at an average of 23.53. He made one century, making 101 against Oxford in the 2013 University Match, with his score the second highest in the match after Oxford's Sam Agarwal made 313. Elliott fared better against Oxford than the county opponents he faced playing for Cambridge MCCU. In addition to playing cricket for Cambridge, he was also the university rackets captain, for which he gained a blue.

Notes and references

External links

1991 births
Living people
People from Epsom
People educated at Tonbridge School
Alumni of Sidney Sussex College, Cambridge
English cricketers
Cambridge MCCU cricketers
Cambridge University cricketers